Pagayawan, officially the Municipality of Pagayawan (Maranao: Inged a Pagayawan), is a 5th class municipality in the province of Lanao del Sur, Philippines. According to the 2020 census, it has a population of 15,057 people.

History
The municipal district of Tatarikan was created as a municipality through Executive Order No. 42 by then President Diosdado Macapagal with effectivity of July 1, 1962. On June 22, 1963, the municipality was renamed to its current name, Pagayawan.

Pagayawan among Borowa belong to Nine Princess of Unayan (e.g. in Meranau term Andong so Macadar, Angkulan so Bita, Dadauba so Biabi, Sana Lumbayanague, etc.)

Geography

Barangays
Pagayawan is politically subdivided into 18 barangays.

Climate

Demographics

Economy

Government
 Somerado Naga Benito (term ended:1998)
 Datu Anwar Benito Datumulok (term ended:2004)
 Mohammad Khalid Diamel (term ended:2013)
 Hanifa Aloyodan-Diamel (present mayor)

References

External links
Pagayawan Profile at the DTI Cities and Municipalities Competitive Index
[ Philippine Standard Geographic Code]
Philippine Census Information
Local Governance Performance Management System

Municipalities of Lanao del Sur
Establishments by Philippine executive order